Earth-like planet may refer to:

 Earth analog, denoting another planet that is very similar to Earth
 Habitable exoplanet, a planet that can support liquid water and thus hypothetically life.
 Terrestrial planet, denoting a planet that is composed of the same materials as Earth, i.e., primarily of silicate rocks or metals